The following is a list of fictional characters from the anime Infinite Ryvius.

Kouji Aiba

; 

From Earth, 16-year-old Kouji is brother to Yuki, childhood friend to Aoi, good friends with fellow piloting student and roommate Ikumi and an honest and good person. The main character, Kouji along with Yuki was raised by their mother after their parents divorced, and unconsciously acts as a patronizing guardian to his brother. He is an average student, ranking 26th on the piloting exams (compared to Yuki and Ikumi, who ranked first and second place respectively). Seemingly weak and spineless, Kouji is in fact very diplomatic and good at dealing with people. Yet for some reason Kouji cannot seem to get along with his own brother, Yuki, as fights, both verbal and physical seem to be inevitable whenever the brothers meet face-to-face. Outside of these domestic disputes, Kouji conducts his life with as little interaction with his brother as possible. Kouji also has an obvious attraction to Uranian aristocrat Fina S. Shinozaki, though how this relationship will proceed, and indeed if Kouji's feelings are even reciprocated, remains to be seen.

With the Ryvius in turmoil, Kouji is the one who tries his best to keep the peace in a non-violent fashion, and possibly one of the very few who still retains vestiges of civilization in him. When he realized his own "cowardice"—his wanting to satisfy everyone, which made him neglect his own feelings and values—he finally brings his friends and the castaways back to civilization.

Aoi Housen

; 

At 16 years of age and a childhood friend to Kouji, Aoi has known the Aiba brothers longer than anyone outside the Aiba family and acts alternately as an older sister and a mother figure to both boys, often going out of her way to check up on them. A flight attendant trainee aboard the Liebe Delta, Aoi often sticks her nose into Kouji's business.  Neither Kouji nor Yuki appreciate her concerns; nor, it appears, do their respective girlfriends, Fina and Cullen. The manga adaptation of Infinite Ryvius is taken from Aoi's viewpoint, in contrast to the anime, which was mostly seen through Kouji's eyes.

Outside of her dealings with the Aibas, Aoi is fast friends with her fellow flight attendant Kozue Izumi. She is also friends with classmate Reiko Ichikawa, though this relationship is not as close as the one with Kozue. All three flight attendant students roomed together on the Ryvius - although eventually Aoi is the only one left occupying that space.

It is soon apparent that Aoi harbours feelings for both the Aiba brothers. However, building on her relationships with the boys was impeded by her lack of will to deal with her feelings. By the time Aoi realized what her feelings were (apparently, she prefers Kouji), Kouji was pursuing a relationship with his own crush, Fina S. Shinozaki, and Yuki's attitude made it impossible for any save the most foolish or most persistent to get close to him. By the end of the series, all relationships and emotions are resolved, and Kouji and Aoi return to the Ryvius as an official couple.

Yuki Aiba
; 

With intelligence, strength, and intuitions superior to his brother's, 15-year-old Yuki Aiba has no need for his older brother Kouji, Kouji's friends or Kouji's patronizing - indeed, fights are inevitable whenever the Aiba boys meet face-to-face. A lone wolf, it is hard for him to live with others. Very athletic, and with outstanding piloting skills, Yuki ranks at the top of the Level 2 piloting class.

Possibly the best pilot on the Ryvius after the Zwei, Yuki is one of the five main operators for the Vital Guarder, a giant mecha that acts as the primary weapon of the Ryvius. He shows himself to be the most skilled operator on a number of occasions. Aside from the above, he also has an interest in girls; he broke off with his first girlfriend, brunette Erina Rigby, aboard the Liebe Delta just prior to the station's collapse. His current girlfriend is Cullen Lucciora, a piloting classmate and fellow Vital Guarder main operator.

Ikumi Oze
; 

At 16 years old, handsome, with good looks and a good fashion sense, the only thing Ikumi lacks is money. Although from Jupiter, an area associated with wealth and prestige, Ikumi claims to be poor and thus remained on the Liebe Delta for the Dive Break despite his friend Kouji's expectations that Ikumi would go home. Ikumi is an excellent piloting student and out of the entire Level 2 class, ranked second in the piloting exams (Kouji's brother Yuki took first place). Charismatic, Ikumi is the 'leader' of Kouji's circle of friends, and has taken notice of Kozue Izumi, his would-be girlfriend. He is Kouji's roommate, both aboard the Liebe Delta and the Ryvius, and the two are good friends. Ikumi is also the main operator for the Vital Guarder, coordinating the other four.

Ikumi is the fourth and last in a successive line of captains aboard the Ryvius, following in the footsteps of such varied individuals such as Lucson Houjou, Aires Blue and - most recently - Juli Bahana. Despite his easy-going, good-humoured nature, Ikumi harboured a dark secret. During his time living a wealthy lifestyle on Jupiter, he fell in love with his own sister. As the current society forbade incest, Ikumi's sister committed suicide, and Ikumi himself relocated to the Liebe Delta soon after. Such a traumatic event in his past made Ikumi very protective of others, towards the point of insanity. This, combined with the increasing amount of violence aboard Ryvius and the brutal assault of his girlfriend, made him a coldhearted leader who cannot seem to distinguish between his allies and enemies, even going so far as to shoot his own friend.

Kozue Izumi
; 

A 16-year-old girl from the moon, Kozue expresses her emotions easily and with clarity as she is honest about them. She wears her hair in twin side pigtails, making her seem younger than she is. In the flight attendant program, which she joined mostly because her friends were also enrolled in it, Kozue becomes good friends with Aoi, and by extension, Kouji and Ikumi. An honest girl, Kozue talks to Yuki without fear, despite his reputation. Kozue has a crush on Ikumi, and only stayed for the Dive Break because he was. She also seems to be somewhat spoiled, and often flaunts her relationship with Ikumi.

Over time Kozue's spoiled behaviour led to several jealous girls, tired of Kozue's selfishness, to attack her. The result of this incident led to Ikumi Oze becoming unhinged. A secondary result was that Kozue requested to leave the dormitory she shared with Aoi and Reiko in favour of a private officer's room, a request that in the circumstances could hardly be refused. She spent most of the remainder of the Ryvius's voyage in that room, unwilling to leave or contact anyone except for Ikumi. Also, she wore her hair down for the last few episodes following her assault, as a testament to the childhood she lost and her newfound maturity; this also makes her resemble Ikumi's sister more. She seems supportive of Ikumi until the very end of the Ryvius's 1st voyage. She is also present on the second voyage, when she reconciles with Aoi, and her relationship with Ikumi is left open.

Cullen Lucciora
; 

Note: This character is referred to in some material as Karen Luchiora.

In a space school where girls tend to go into flight attendant classes while the boys become pilots and mechanics, 16-year-old Cullen is against the norm as one of the few female Level 2 piloting students aboard the Liebe Delta seen in the Ryvius. While quite capable, coming in fifth place on the piloting exams, Cullen can also be fickle and enjoys acting on her own rather than with a group of people. Seen as a background character in the initial episodes (she was the girl who returned Ikumi's music card to him in the premier), she eventually comes into prominence later on. When she sees something she wants, she often goes to great lengths to get it - be it a music card or a boyfriend.

Cullen plays by her own rules, and only does what she wants, wandering around alone quite often. Her number one interest is music, and she is always in search of songs she likes. She sometimes chooses to sleep in a tent inside the ship rather than in the residential area, although this may be to listen to her music in peace and without crewmates asking she turn down the volume. Cullen is one of the five main operators of the Vital Guarder, and the current girlfriend of fellow lone-wolf and VG pilot Yuki Aiba.

Fina S. Shinozaki

; 

Note: This character is referred to in some material as Faina S. Shinozaki.

Having been born and raised on Uranus, where the harsh environment of the planet gave rise to a special form of religion, Fina has a unique sense of ethics based on the followings of her sect's founder, Mother Arne. At 16, Fina is extremely beautiful, but due to her aloof mannerisms stemming from her beliefs and her standing in the Uranian aristocracy, she is hard to approach. Rescued by Kouji Aiba and Ikumi Oze during the collapse of the Liebe Delta, Kouji was attracted to her at first sight, though Fina's unique sense of ethics may keep the two from getting closer. She has a pet ferret, Rafra, who becomes the unofficial mascot for the Ryvius. Fina's creed is "cut off the past with your own hands", which she sometimes takes too literally.

Despite her initial appearance of being normal (and somewhat privileged), it is revealed Fina has a dark and disturbing secret. Not only does her beauty, charisma and demure mannerisms hide an unstable madness, but following her personal creed as mentioned above, Fina is also guilty of murder.

She followed an extreme interpretation of her religious beliefs, stating that in order to cut off the past she had to literally cut it off. This unfortunately involved Fina killing with her bare hands anyone that reminded her of the past, including her former boyfriend McBain, and her friend Sandy Aren, who was strangled and her body disposed of under the cover of the celebrations of the Ryvius's party in episodes 10-11. A motive given for her first murder suggests her religious interpretation was a coping mechanism evolved after the fact. However, as Fina found out from Kouji and later Neya, the past will always linger. This  and the fact she overhears Kouji declaring that their relationship is over, likely drove Fina into a complete mental breakdown - as if her actions in episode 25 were not indication enough, Fina does not return with the others to the Ryvius in the next episode. In the last episode Kouji, given the honour of deciding the Ryvius' new first destination, chooses to visit the Uranus vicinity because he has some things he wishes to discuss with her.

Neya
; 

Note: This character is referred to in some material as Neeya.

A strange person in an equally bizarre outfit, she murmurs the thoughts and words of others as if not understanding what they mean. She initially appeared before Kouji during the collapse of the Liebe Delta. As the series progresses and she gains strength, Neya encounters others aboard the Ryvius. Most notable of these is Nicks, who develops a sort of attraction to the eye-catching pink-clad young woman - he certainly doesn't forget her appearance. Hard to miss, Neya is often seen wandering through the halls or outside the ship unprotected. The latter is impossible, as anyone going out must wear a spacesuit or suffer a gruesome death. A notable exception to this rule is when the field is up: fairly early in the series, during repairs on the ship, a member was seen on the ship's hull without any garment but a towel. Furthering the rumours of a ghost, Neya was once perceived walking straight through solid walls by unsuspecting students.

It was revealed that she is the biological core for the Ryvius (one of a series of sentient ships using creatures called Vaia). Although not human, she based her form on the body of a deceased young woman drifting outside in space by the Ryvius. That young woman was the daughter of Conrad Vicuss, the man in charge of hunting down the Ryvius. When Neya herself appears before Conrad in one of the last episodes, it is understandable that he should be shocked to see his own daughter acting as defender and guardian over the Ryvius. It is through Neya's intervention and assistance that those aboard the Ryvius survived their ordeal, and she continues to act in her capacity as the ship's Sphix - an alien defending the Ryvius and her young crew.

Team Blue
 is the moniker for a martial arts group from Saturn featured in the sci-fi anime series Infinite Ryvius. The group functions almost like a street gang aboard the Ryvius, and uses violence to seize power and attempt to bring people under their control. For a time, they were the de facto leaders of the Ryvius, and after their fall some members regained power in successive regimes aboard the ship. The gang gets their name from Airs Blue (see below).

Airs Blue 
; 

Appearing much older than he really is, Airs Blue (age 15) is the leader of Team Blue, and at one point, Captain of the Ryvius. Skilled in martial arts himself, Blue intentionally puts himself in danger so as to feel alive. He was suppressing his violent side when on the Liebe Delta, but the Ryvius is a whole new environment and Blue sees the opportunity to unleash his natural aggression and take over the ship. The fact he owns the only firearm on the Ryvius, a needle-shooting pistol stolen from one of the saboteurs of the Liebe Delta, assists his coup significantly.

He was also the brain behind the Ryvius's hated points system, which had all but the five Vital Guarder operators, Zwei, non-Zwei bridge crew and the Team Blue members earning points for food and essentials. The exceptions were those listed above, as they received unlimited points, and this unfair treatment was one of the reasons the crew revolted against Blue's regime and his gang. His entire gang captured, only Blue managed to escape by going into hiding in the bowels of the Ryvius.

Blue's reign comes to an abrupt end thanks to Stein, who transmits part of a conversation throughout the entire Ryvius in the hopes that the others will get rid of Blue, who Stein sees as nothing but a barbarian and not good enough to be on the bridge at all, much less captain.  In a fit of anger, Ikumi accuses Blue of plotting to take the Vital Guarder and abandon the Ryvius.  As with Juli, Blue simply says, "What'll you do if I am?"  It is not known if he was serious, or if he was saying it as an assertion of power, or purely as a hypothetical situation.

He's later discovered by Kouji, who helps him by smuggling food to Blue's hiding place.  Although initially suspicious of Kouji's motives, Blue has no choice but to trust him and even ends up giving Kouji his gun, claiming that, "I'm kinda interested to see how you'll use it."

It's interesting that despite their hatred of the points system, both his successors (Juli and Ikumi) decided to keep it going, even keeping unlimited points to the chosen few.

His father is the Minister of Defence on Saturn, although nothing is known about his mother.  At one point, Juli accuses Blue of planning to hand over the Ryvius to his father in exchange for safety (Blue doesn't confirm or deny this, saying simply and rather ambiguously, "What if I am?").  The implication that Blue's father wouldn't be willing to help his son or any of the others unless there was something in it for him indicates that the two aren't all that close (in fact, Blue's only comment upon hearing of the destruction of Hyperion and his father's death is, "What a way to go.")

Blue appears to have an interest in Juli Bahana. While he seemed to find her views naive, he seemed fascinated with her feelings and emotions regardless. During the party, it is implied that Blue entered Juli in the beauty contest anonymously as he also ordered her to go to the party and gave her a dress to wear. His feelings for Juli are confirmed by Neya who speaks his thoughts aloud in which Blue mentions his desire for revenge and his hatred for his family is gone only to be replaced by thoughts of Juli Bahana. It is not known if Blue and Juli become an official couple; although both return to the Ryvius, they do so separately (Blue's presence is only confirmed by a shot of Yuki clutching his bandanna and laughing triumphantly, having obviously won the long-awaited rematch between them).  Juli, on the other hand, is seen to be wearing a ring on her wedding finger, but it has never revealed whether or not it is actually an engagement or wedding ring or, for that matter, that it was Blue who gave it to her.

Fuu Nam Chai 
; 

A distant relative of Blue's, he is also from Saturn. At 16, Fuu is Blue's right-hand man and is in charge of executing Team Blue operations. Although very intelligent, this skilled fighter is hot-tempered and at times can be very ditzy. Along with the rest of Team Blue except for Blue himself, Fuu ended up in the Ryvius's brig when their coup was ironically overthrown in a revolt by the rest of the ship's crew. He was the one in the white tuxedo who acted as Master of Ceremonies during the Ryvius's party.

Criff Cay 

The seductress of Team Blue, 15-year-old  is good looking and knows it. The older, taller, and red-haired Kei girl, she came with her sister Michelle to Liebe Delta for nursing training. Criff is always in provocative outfits flirting, and she seduced information out of Charlie after beatings were found to be much less effective. When Team Blue fell from power, Charlie rushed to her aid despite her treatment of him, and after a brawl both were thrown into the same cell in the brig. Criff warmed to Charlie during their stay together, and when Michelle offered her a chance to escape with her, she ended up remaining with Charlie, and the two went into hiding. Criff is a transgender girl.

Michelle Cay 

A year younger than her older sister,  looks nothing like Criff but has a slightly wild appeal of her own. Short, both of stature and of her green hair, Michelle laughs a great deal, often chews pink bubble gum, and seems airheaded. However, this is a front for her more dangerous abilities, and given the chance could prove even more dangerous than Airs Blue. She is one for holding grudges, and anyone who had happened to annoy her to that point have since paid a heavy price. Like her sister, Michelle is adept at seduction, and used her skills to obtain a new wardrobe and the freedom of her fellow Team Blue members from the brig. Unfortunately she was raped by several boys after being captured during the uprising.

Although she falls for Stein's trickery and, along with the others on the Ryvius, becomes convinced Blue was going to betray them and is furious with him because of it, Michelle still retains a certain dependency on Airs Blue.  This can be seen on the penultimate episode; when the soldiers have boarded the Ryvius and are firing at them, and Michelle starts screaming for Blue to help her.

Zwei
 is the designation given to an elite class of second-year students aboard the Liebe Delta space station in the futuristic sci-fi anime series Infinite Ryvius - they are quite literally space cadets. Composed of 12 students, this class was given responsibility to steer the Liebe Delta into the Geduld as part of the station's regular system maintenance. This maneuver (called the Dive) was considered so routine it was entrusted to the Zwei, under supervision from their instructors. The Dive was sabotaged, and was ultimately a failure, with the instructors all dead and the Zwei, as the most advanced students in the Liebe Delta, forced to take control of the station and later, the Ryvius.

Despite their elite status and being considered second only to the instructors, many of the Zwei are not that skilled. Their longer training gives them an edge on their shipmates, but they are still students too - a fact the resentful crew of the Ryvius often seem to forget.

Zwei is the German word for two, signifying the group as the next or second generation of humanity's leaders.

Juli Bahana
; 

A scholarship student, 16-year-old Juli is the top-ranking student and recognised leader of the Zwei. During Lucson's stint as "captain", she was the actual de facto exerciser of that role, and after the fall of Team Blue, was appointed the role by majority vote.  Her parents are presumed to have died at an early age, as she grew up in an orphanage and thus tends to solve problems by herself. Calm and kind, with an inner fortitude, Juli lacks the charisma of a leader. She is very beautiful, and those around her (especially her mostly-male classmates) see it as a shame she lacks a sense of her own femininity. She helped take care of Pat when the Ryvius initially started up, and he looks up to her as a surrogate sister and mother. Juli realizes she had fallen in love with Airs Blue immediately after the end of his reign and wishes to see him again after he escapes and hides himself. At one point after her reign of the Ryvius, Juli is seen in her room wearing the dress Blue gave her while thinking about him. At the end of the anime, Juli returns to the Ryvius and is wearing an engagement ring. Although Blue also returns to the Ryvius, it is unclear whether he gave her the ring.

Lucson Houjou
; 

Loud, blustering and generally ineffective, 17-year-old Lucson is the self-proclaimed captain of the Ryvius and leader of the Zwei (titles recognised only by Lucson, as the rest of the crew have other people in those positions). In the Zwei for training for entry to the National Defense Academy, Lucson has his family honor and pride to live up to; his father and three brothers are already in the service. This pompous boy's complete lack of leadership skills is obvious to everyone, that is, except Lucson himself. After a stint as the captain of the Ryvius, Lucson was demoted to ship's janitor and Pat's caretaker. Yet despite these indignities, he still has his pride.  He's essentially good-hearted, and takes a beating towards the end of the series in an attempt to protect Pat.

Stein Heigar
; 

Cool-headed and very smart, 17-year-old Heigar is studying general information technology in preparation for entry into the National Defense Academy. His father is a civil officer in the Defense Forces. As the second-ranked student in the Zwei after Juli, Heigar acts as an assistant and lieutenant to the leader and captain of the ship, whoever he or she may be (in other words, loyalty to the office and not its holder). His aloofness, combined with an ever-present poker face, has others believing he is emotionless. Cold, calculating and ambitious, Heigar somehow often has no problem persuading others to accept his decisions or grant him power. His desire for an utopian society on the Ryvius led to an increasingly harsh regime, to the point where he was willing to turn in even fellow Zwei cadets as so-called 'threats' to the order and control of the ship.

Charlie (Good Turtleland III)

Joining the Zwei at his parents' request, this chubby boy of 16 years is timid and sheepish despite his great name. He hops between the elite Zwei and the street gang Team Blue, whose members gave him the nickname 'Charlie'. He fell head over heels for Team Blue seductress Criff Kei, not realizing until much too late that she was only leading him on. During the coup that overthrew Team Blue, Charlie could have stayed safe as a member of the Zwei. Unwilling to forsake the girl he (still) loved, Charlie went out to Criff's defense and took the beating meant for her. This selfless act thawed out Criff's cold heart, and she became considerably warmer to him, even choosing to stay by his side when Michelle offered her a chance at freedom. The last episode seems them as a couple and Charlie is unrecognizable initially as he had lost weight.

Carabona Guinea
; 

The second of three female Zwei cadets, she is the mousy-haired, slightly square girl who also appears to be the Ryvius' communications officer. She does the announcements from the bridge whenever Kouji and Fina are absent, and is a roommate of Juli, Pat and Ran. She seems to have a flair with designing and making clothes, as she made a number of outfits for the various students on the Ryvius to wear for the ship's party, and also created Ran's cheongsam dress. Ginny was rather put out that Ran didn't want to go to the party and wear the dress, until Ran abruptly changed her mind. Ginny also started going out with fellow Zwei cadet Chic Kraat after he asked her to should they survive what turned out to be the last of the Ryvius' many battles.

Ran Luckmolde
; 

Cold and cynical, it is hard to tell who is more frigid—Heigar or Ran. This 17-year-old girl is the third and last female member of the mostly-boys Zwei class. Ran develops some kind of attraction for Pat Campbell, even though he is half her age and prefers Ginny and Juli's more open company to Ran's. This attraction becomes apparent as the series goes on despite Ran's attempts to hide it. Indeed, it was insinuated by Heigar that Ran's emotions concerning Pat bordered on shota-con. Ran slapped Heigar by means of reply, and Heigar retaliated by demoting Ran from her elite Zwei status to a failing E student and had her thrown out of the bridge.

Pat Campbell
; 

Although not a member of the Zwei per se, Pat is seen as such as he was brought into Juli's care. He came to the Liebe Delta to visit his father while the ship was diving. When the space station collapsed, Mr. Campbell perished attempting to save the lives of all the students aboard, and Pat went through the terrible experience of losing a parent. Handsome and with a bright future, Pat makes the best sandwiches and always wears his teddy bear backpack. The youngest child aboard the Liebe Delta at its collapse, at 8 years old Pat is also the youngest child on the Ryvius. In the end he seems to have transferred his dependency from Juli to Ran, holding an item given to him from Ran before she left.

Brian Brabb, Jr.
; 

Brian is one of the older Zwei and a selfish, timeserving young man. When Team Blue was in control of the ship, he began a relationship with Michelle Kei, but disposed of her as soon as Blue lost power. He also is a vocal proponent of the point system, or whatever else gets him his way. Later, he is shot for opposing Ikumi's harsh rule on the Ryvius.

Kevin Green
; 

The overweight member of the Zwei with short black hair and glasses. After disposing of Charlie, flirting with Eins and Brian, and attempting to seduce Stein, Criff dotes on Kevin. However, he rejects her when Blue's plan to abandon the Ryvius is revealed.

Eins Crawford
; 

At 15, Eins is one of the youngest Zwei, along with Chic Kraat. Criff briefly flirts with him after dumping Charlie.

Chic Kraat
; 

Initially, Chic seems to be bossy and cold. However, towards the end of the series, he expresses his feelings for Carabona.

Kreis Morate
; 

Quiet and a bit nerdy, Kreis is the programming genius of the Zwei and designed many of the Solid programs. He helps Heigar initiate the rebellion against Team Blue.

Gran McDaniel
; 

Gran is ambitious and prefers not to work with his fellow Zwei. He tries to convince Son Doppo, a member of Team Blue to help him escape from the ship while abandoning the other students in the process. However, he and Son are caught, beaten by the other male members of Team Blue and put into jail cells on the ship.

Reiko Ichikawa
; 

This plain-faced flight attendant trainee was roommates with Aoi, Kozue, and (briefly) Fina. Timid by nature, Reiko proves to be selfish and cowardly in a hostile situation, when Kozue was ganged up on and attacked by several other girls for being the girlfriend of an "unlimited points user". Reiko, feeling unable to help and stunned by the fact that battles between women were even more ugly than men's, ignored Kozue's cries for help and fled. She was the last to move out of the dorm used by the four girls, the first being Fina, who in following her religious beliefs left in favour of a private officer's room, and the second being Kozue, whose injury had her hiding in another officer's room unable and unwilling to contact anyone. Before moving out of the dorm, she was scared to death by a raging Ikumi, who had gone and trashed the dorm and even threatening to kill her, pouring shampoo on her head and grabbing hold of it. She later joins Fina's "religious group" in hope that the past can be forgotten. When the Ryvius is under siege by Ikumi, she fears that he will come after her and kill her.

Nicks Chaiplapat
; 

A hyperactive boy from Deimos, a moon of Mars, 13-year-old Nicks is a Level 2 Flight Class student. He was the boy who made it a point of rubbing in Ikumi's failure to retrieve a piece of debris in the first episode. When first exploring the Ryvius, Nicks discovered what became the Vital Guarder system and is one of its sub-pilots/operators. Nicks likes racing utility robots and slacking off, and on the Ryvius is the roommate of Kouji and Ikumi. Nicks also likes pretty girls, as evidenced when he used binoculars for up-close looks at the contestants in the Miss Ryvius beauty contest.

Akihiro Miyabi
; 

A plump boy from Mars, Akihiro is meticulous and withdrawn. He and Nicks are childhood friends, and although at 16 he is older than Nicks by three years, Akihiro gets treated as a little brother by the overactive Nicks. Preferring on the whole to work in the background and do his best, Akihiro often has to keep Nicks from slacking and/or going out-and-out nuts. In addition with Nicks, Akihiro is also one of the VG's many sub-pilots and operators. He believes that Kouji is like Akihiro himself, a weak-willed person who would rather stay on the sidelines and let others do what they will. Kouji, however, proved Akihiro's assumption wrong, and Akihiro resolved to be a stronger person, a decision he told Kouji of in a letter Akihiro sent to Kouji during the last episode.

Kibure Kikki
; 

Kikki constantly wears a dinosaur-like mascot-style costume and serves as a background character. She appears in passing or in crowds scenes at least once every episode, and many fans of the series have made a point of searching for her in the episode they are viewing. Aside from this, she usually a loner, but appears with a fellow costumer in Episode 11. Possibly the only exception to this is Cullen, whom Kikki accidentally clonked on the head with the headpiece of one of her other costumes when the gravity control on the ship failed. They were seen talking together in a few subsequent episodes, but this was likely just a casual acquaintance as Cullen did not appear to have anything to do with Kikki after the former became a Vital Guarder operator.

Johnson Cole
; 

A 16-year-old boy, Johnny appears to be the clumsy nerd character of the show. He then, to her annoyance, becomes her self-proclaimed stalker and is seen in many episodes trying to make advances on her. So much so that he even went as far as to try and capture her with a pair of clamps when the Ryvius's gravity went offline after the Vital Guarder first separated from the Ryvious in order to "secure" her safety. He was thwarted when the girl's best friend head butted him in the chest. Later on, at the end of the series he risks his life to save the girl earning her affection and admiration. They are seen together as an official couple when returning to the Ryvius.

Radan
; 

Typically known as Pillow Boy, he is named in episode 11 as being Radan. He has become one of the funniest running gag characters on the show. He is always seen with nothing but a pillow covering his privates. Apparently having lost all his clothing when the Lebria Delta was destroyed in the sabotaged dive. He never once seems to have asked anyone for some extra pants and is constantly seen naked. Even scaring Kikki when she wondered onto him once. Like Kikki he is seen at least once every episode and many people have made it a game trying to spot him.

Emerson Elby and Lilith Frau
Emerson Elby (エマーソン・エルビィ) and Lilith Frau (リリッシュ・フラゥ) are probably the only normal couple on board the Ryvius. First seen in episode three when the two sneak into a storage closet to make out, only to be "rudely interrupted" when the Zwei order everyone to evacuate when the Libra Delta begins to sink. They are seen a few more times in the show and they are always together. Despite this however as the series progresses, particularly after the points system is added, their relationship starts to degrade, with Emerson constantly trying to take his girlfriend's points in an attempt to bet on races that he keeps losing. By the end of the series he does not return to the ship because of fear, but Lilith does.

References

Infinite Ryvius